Darkzone, Laserzone, Megazone, Ultrazone and Zone 3 are a group of laser skirmish sites that use laser tag systems manufactured by P&C Micros of Melbourne, Australia. These systems and sites are sometimes collectively referred to as being a part of the "Zone Empire" and in most cases incorporate the word "Zone" in their name.

The names Darkzone, Zone 3. Megazone, and Laserzone are more commonly used in Australia while Ultrazone is used in the U.S. Canada is also known to use the Darkzone name. Not all Zone Empire sites are known by these names, even in these regions; some sites use the Zone equipment and have their own distinctive name.

Zone sites are in the business of providing both recreational and competitive indoor laser games (or laser tag). The games require players to wear vests, or packs that contain a number of infrared sensors, and carry around a laser emitting phasor which activate these sensors and deactivate the hit player's pack and phasor for a period of time. There are many different kinds of game formats, many of which are team-based and played with three teams total. In most cases the games are played in large indoor arenas.

Many Zone sites run weekly leagues in which players of various skill levels compete. Regular leagues are run in Darkzone Perth (WA), Laserzone (QLD), Zone 3 (ACT), Laser Realm (VIC) & Megazone (SA). There are also inter-site competitions, such as a North vs. South competition between the sites based in Western Australia, the two SE Queensland sites and the state competition for the Victorian sites. Once a year there is also an annual National Titles competition between sites from all over Australia and New Zealand. The National Titles has been running since 1999 and has had between 18 and 22 teams attend each year since 2004.

Technology

T2 "Infusion"

Packs 
Vests, or packs, are strapped onto players, and have on them a number of sensors encased in clear plastic which are designed to detect the infrared light which is shot by the phasors. Six sensors are located on the front and back of the pack, on each shoulder and on the phasor itself. The sensors are surrounded by coloured LEDs which light up in the colour of the player's team. Players are known to be active when their pack lights are flashing. When a player's sensors are shot by another player, the player is said to be deactivated, and will remain this way for a number of seconds. During this time the player's sensors and pack lights are turned off, along with the player's phasor, so he or she cannot shoot for this time either. The player will be reactivated after a period of time that differs depending on the game's settings.

The pack's display usually holds information, such as remaining time, or power, depending on the game being played. There is a black button on the front that players can press to light up the display, or that is sometimes used to join some games called black button games, where knowing how many players are participating is important. There is also a round part on the front that receives a member's login button, or login tab, which is used to attribute statistics from certain games to a member account, so that a member can see how they compare to other players over an accumulated number of games.

Phasors 
The phasors are relatively small and are operated by a trigger, shooting infrared light which is detected by other player's sensors, and base devices, and also emit a visible dot of red light roughly to where the phasor is aimed. The phasors are connected to the packs by a cable, and have sensors on them, on the top, like the packs do, which allow the player to receive return-fire, even when the pack sensors are hidden. The phasors also have a touch-sensitive sensor underneath them, near the front of the phasor, which a player must place their hand on while playing, otherwise will be unable to shoot. This ensures that players hold their phasors with both hands and do not carelessly drop them. However some "cheats" will take along items like Blu-Tac to cover the sensor, enabling one-handed shots, and many experienced players can cover the sensor and pull the trigger with the same hand. This is widely considered cheating and some newer packs seem to be less affected by these "cheats".

Bases 
Bases, or base devices, are the devices located in areas around the arena. The device itself and the area around the device are both known as "bases" to players, although it is clear to players that the device is what is being referred to when talking about destroying a base or shooting at a base and the area around the base is being referred to when talking about going to a base or sitting in a base. The device is contained by an open box which is mounted on a wall somewhere, and the device itself is hemispherical in appearance, black, and decorated by flashing lights. There are many red lights on it for decoration. However, there are three green lights located around it which are also sensors and which players shoot at; inexperienced players often have trouble because they aim at the red lights, which are not sensors. If a player shoots the base a sufficient number of times (determined by the game's settings), the player will eventually deactivate or destroy the base, which means that the player has just collected a large number of points for their team, and also that the base has been deactivated for a period of time. Depending on the game's settings, the base may shoot back once it has been deactivated, or while a player is shooting at it. Players hit by a base are deactivated for a period of time. In some games, the bases are used for completely different purposes, or not at all.

In games in which bases are used, a particular focus is placed on the bases because often they are the largest source of points for players. In games such as these, common team tactics are to invade and occupy an enemy base area in the hopes that each player on the team can destroy the base, thereby earning a large number of points. Because in these games the points earned by deactivating other players pales in comparison to the points earned by destroying bases, deactivating players is often merely used as a means whereby a player can stop an enemy from destroying a base and earning points, or a means whereby a player can secure a period of time in which they can destroy the base.

Reload Bays 
Some games are played with reloads enabled, which means that the number of shots a player can fire, or the number of times a player can be deactivated, is limited by a power level the player has. Each player has a certain amount of power for their pack, which is used up slowly by shooting and used up more quickly by being deactivated. Once that power is used up, in order to resume play the player must go to a reload bay, which are walk-in areas around the arena which will resupply the player with power. The actual device that reloads the packs is a green, flashing device on the wall or roof of the reload bay. Shots and deactivations use up the same supply of energy, so if a player is continually deactivated, they will not only have a lower number of deactivations left until they must reload, they will also have a lower number of shots to use. After a player reloads there is a short delay before they are reactivated.

Games that use reloads are different from games that do not because of the way players are forced to act. A common tactic in games involving bases, is to sit in a base area and camp there for a long time, defending it or waiting to attack it. In games that use reloads, players are forced to vacate areas from time to time, so that attackers can buy time in which they can safely attack the base, by shooting the defenders until they must reload. Likewise, defenders can shoot attackers until they have to reload, and then take up the freedom to position players in areas best suited to attacking the base, so that the attackers cannot easily attack the base.

Nexus Generation (FEC)
The first Nexus system was Nexus Generation FEC (Family entertainment centre). The system brought an entirely new different laser tag experience being one of the first laser tag systems to use true colour LEDs and sets a new standard for future laser systems. Like its predecessors it has the ability to change settings through the software to whatever game the players may desire. Nexus FEC is primarily aimed at parties and other groups. It has the option of membership for regular players, however in some cases this was never put to use by some laser tag centres.

Nexus Generation Pro 
An upgrade from Nexus FEC with some new hardware and pack alterations as well as software and firmware alterations. The standard LCDs, similar to those in the Infusion packs were scrapped from Nexus FEC and replaced with a brand new coloured LCD display. Many other features have altered including the shoulders sensors with built in speakers. As for looks there is not really much difference between both version, with the exception of the shoulders which had speakers placed within them and the Nexus logo removed from inside.

Packs

Phasors 
Unlike its predecessors, Nexus has a totally new design in both the phasor and pack. The older model, black plastic phasor cases were scrapped and replaced with a new transparent case complete with members button reader on the side of the phasor (Infusion has it located on the front of the vest). Nexus is also one of the first laser tag systems to use green lasers rather than the standard red lasers used in most laser tag systems. New LCD screens in Nexus Pro replaced standard LCDs used in Infusion and Nexus FEC.

Bases 
Another significant change from the earlier infusion system. The old dome shaped bases featuring surrounding LEDs were completely redesigned for a slimmer more flat square shaped base with the speaker located in the middle. True colour LEDs flash simultaneously around the base when not under attack. As with the packs, the main computer uses the software to change the settings of the bases. Like the nexus gun plastics the bases are transparent, enabling players to see exactly what colour the base is.

Helios
In 2014 Zone launched a new laser tag system called Helios. It features the same vest as Nexus Pro but with a completely redesigned phaser. The phaser has a 3-inch led screen on the rear of the phaser capable of displaying game information and showing pictures of who shot you when you die.
The system also features a new membership system using qr code cards to log in by touching the right front sensor with it. The players score are automatically loaded into an online database ad can be used in any zone site worldwide.
The 2015 Australasian titles were the first to use the new system and meant that most teams had very little experience with the system

Game rules 
There are many different types of games at Darkzone stores. Standard games are typically played during regular store hours, and there are special novelty games which are played at special events or other times. Also there is a special kind of game for the Darkzone Leagues, which is similar to the standard game, but with variations to make it more challenging and competitive.

Standard games 
Standard games are the games that are most often played in stores during the day. They come in two varieties, depending on preference and the amount paid: Solo games and Team-based games. Team-based games have the players divided into three teams. The players from each of the three teams must start the game in their team's base area. A major goal is to attack and destroy the enemy bases, of which there are two, and it is possible to destroy each of them twice. To destroy the bases, a player must shoot at the base three times in succession; a substantial pause in between, such as might be caused by a distraction, or deactivation of the player attacking the base, will require that the player start all over again. Also, if one player attacks the base, and then another player shoots it, the first player might have to start again. Around 2,000 points are earned for players who destroy a base, meaning that players can gain around 4,000 points by destroying all of the bases in the time allocated.

In a standard game it is possible to shoot and deactivate enemy players, but not teammates. Each player has an unlimited number of shots to fire and there is no limit on the number of times the player can be deactivated. Each time a player shoots another player they receive a number of points, depending on which sensor they shot at, and the player who was shot loses a smaller number of points. (Rules have recently been changed  - no points lost for being shot). Solo games function by similar rules, with two noted exceptions: Players are able to tag all bases for points, and that the friendly fire condition in Team games has been disabled, allowing players to freely tag each other with no restrictions. Both forms of the standard game can be variated with a 'fast mode', in which deactivation times are halved and fire rates increased. In these modes, it is not uncommon for the base to be able to deactivate players when destroyed (resulting in a long deactivation period for the player).

League Games 
League games (or League X) are similar to standard games but differ from standard games in a number of ways. First of all there is a long list of technical rules, related to how players are allowed to move, hold their phasors, etc. to prevent cheating or dangerous movement. League games last for only 12 minutes and in that time each player is only allowed to destroy each enemy base once. League games are played with reloads, so there is a limit on the number of shots or deactivations a player can have in a row, and it is possible to shoot and deactivate teammates, although not possible to shoot your team's base or yourself.

Shooting bases is different in league games also, for whenever a player shoots a base, they lose 500 points. The player shoots the base twice, losing 500 points each time, and then when the player shoots it a final time, gains 1000 points to regain the points lost from the first two shots, and 3001 points for destroying the base. If a player shoots the base once or twice without destroying it, and is deactivated, or distracted for long enough, then the player will have to start all over again, losing even more points the next time the player shoots the base; the player will only gain 4001 points for destroying the base, so failing to shoot the base too many times may result in a significant loss in points for the team. This means that players must be very careful to destroy the base on the first attempt. If a defending player deactivates an attacking player after they have shot the base once or twice and before the attacker has destroyed the base, the defending player earns 500 points for that deactivation, in addition to the fact that the attacker has just lost 500 or 1000 points.

League games are overlooked by a number of referees who stand in the arena with the players, watching for violations of the rules. Referees hold what are commonly known as god boxes, which are remotes with three buttons on them that can be used to punish players who break the rules, either by shielding them or terminating them. The shield is a warning punishment used for minor offences, and it has the effect that a player cannot shoot or be shot for a period of time, like being deactivated, except that the lights on the pack stay on, and the player does not lose power. Terminations deactivate a player for a period of time, and in addition they remove a large number of points from the player, and these are used for major offences. There are two types of terminations, level ones and level twos, the level two termination being the more severe of the two. If a player receives three level two terminations, then the player leaves the game and receives a zero score.

League games are faster paced than standard games, because of their competitive nature and also because of the shorter time the game is played in. League games are also more challenging and difficult, because many experienced players can learn some very advanced techniques, for instance standing or sitting in certain, legal positions, that obscure their sensors effectively, the ability to bounce shots off reflective surfaces, and various other skills related to attacking bases or defending against other players.

There are variations between the implementations of the league game formats and the rules used for league games, from store to store, league to league, or season to season, as the organizers might make changes to improve the challenge and quality of the game.

One Base Denial 
One Base Denial is a team game where every team (usually three teams) goes for one base. The rules are the same as league games. Every player can destroy the base as many times as they can but this can be difficult as they are usually denied (deactivated) by another player while taking the base due to the large number of players.

Vampire 
Vampire is a novelty game played sometimes at Darkzone stores. The game does not involve bases, and is not actually team-based, instead it involves players known as peasants and vampires. The game begins with one vampire, who has unlimited shots and lives, and the rest of the players are peasants who have a limited number of shots and lives. The aim of the game is for the vampires to turn everyone else into vampires, and for the peasants to survive until the end of the time limit of the game. Often the vampire is given some sort of advantage, such as a shorter deactivation time and increased fire rate (Peasants can also be given a disadvantage of longer deactivations times and reduced fire rates. In some arenas, both of these rules are in effect simultaneously). Vampires can shoot one another and peasants can shoot one another.

Zone Ball 
Zone Ball is a novelty game played sometimes at Darkzone stores. The game involves bases, but instead of trying to destroy the bases, players use the bases as a sort of soccer goal. The game is team-based, and the aim of the game is for each team to score the highest number of goals in the game. In the beginning, players must stand in their team's base, and then the bases lights will turn on. The first player to shoot any base anywhere, is given the ball, and an audible signal will be heard every few seconds to confirm that the player has the ball. There is only one ball at any one time in the game. The goal is then to make it into an enemy base and shoot their base to score a point. Players can pass the ball to teammates by shooting them, and players may steal the ball from enemy players by shooting the player with the ball. Players can shoot enemies who do not have the ball, in order to deactivate them for a period of time, so that they cannot steal the ball or cause any trouble. Once a player has scored a goal by shooting an enemy base while in possession of the ball, there is a short delay before the ball is up for grabs again, at which point players can grab the ball by being the first to shoot any base.

Time Warrior 
Time Warrior is a novelty game played sometimes at Darkzone stores. The game does not involve bases and is not team-based. At the beginning of the game, each player is given a certain amount of time. Time is constantly being used up, but the player can gain more time by shooting and deactivating enemy players. A player who is deactivated will have effectively lost the time they spent deactivated in, because in that time they are unable to shoot players to gain more time. A player who is constantly being deactivated, or who cannot shoot and deactivate any enemy players, will eventually run out of time and will leave the arena. The winner of the game is the player who is the last player in the game, or who has the most time left when the time limit for the game is over.

Stratego 
This is the classic game of Stratego that has become so popular. At the game start, each team will choose someone from their team to be their "General" and someone to be their "Decoy". When the game is running, the general and decoy packs will be orange with their team colour flashing for shoulders. This means that other players will not be able to distinguish between the general and the decoy during the game. This is an eliminator game. The objective is to eliminate the other teams' generals. If a general is eliminated, the entire team is automatically eliminated.

The winner at the end is decided by first looking at the General, if more than one team has the general still in, then the decoy is looked at. If more than one team still has the general and decoy in, then the number of deacs remaining on the general is looked at, then the decoy, then the number of remaining players. Ties should rarely happen.

Domination 
This game originated from the Unreal Tournament game style. When the game begins, none of the bases will be active but will still be waiting for shots. The first player to tag a base turns it to their color (only 1 shot). No points are immediately awarded. After 5 seconds if the base is still the same, that player receives 50 points for themselves and their team. After 3 more seconds, they receive 100 more points. Then every 3 seconds after they receive 200 points. At any time during the game, an opponent can tag the base just once to turn it to their color and restart the timer for themselves.

If your team holds 2 bases at the same time then both base values are doubled. If your team holds all 3, then all 3 base values are quadrupled.

Base flags 
Base flags is a simple game where you try to score as many points as you can for your team by destroying opponents bases. Each base only takes one shot to destroy. However, each player will need to return to their home base to reload every time they are deactivated. No points are awarded for tagging players.

Terminator 
Terminator is a game style similar to Vampires, and is generally used with larger groups. Players are divided into teams of Humans and Terminators. A certain number of players are chosen to become Terminators, and are sent in after the remaining players enter the arena. These remaining players have some time to obtain a secure position before the game starts. The Terminators are sent in to eliminate the Humans, while the Humans are able to win either by surviving for the time period of the game or by destroying the Terminators. Human players are given limited lives and have slower firing rates and longer deactivation times, while Terminators have more lives, faster firing rates and shorter deactivation times (This balances out the numerical advantage given to the Humans).

Australian and New Zealand Leagues and Competitions

Western Australian Leagues 
Perth, Western Australia has three stores, a store in Willetton called Darkzone, a store in Northbridge called Zone 3 and a store in Malaga called Darkzone. The Northbridge store has since shut down, and the Willetton and Malaga stores were renamed to Lazer Blaze in the 2010s. A third Lazer Blaze was opened in Port Kennedy. All stores have regular social leagues that people can play in for a greater challenge and a good time. All three stores are owned and run by Wombat, so the leagues are very similar and there is also an annual League played between the three stores, (formerly known as North vs. South), where regular players from each store compete against one another over three weekends. Finally there is an occasional doubles tournament consisting of many teams of two players, and a solos tournament that are played at both stores.

The format of the regular social League is a team-based competition where teams consist of 5 players and compete for league points for most of the league, to earn a position on the competition ladder that runs for about 11 weeks. The competition is a very rough round-robin style where each team plays three games each week and eventually plays all of the other teams. Points are awarded to teams depending on the results of the game, and the player with the highest individual score for a game also earns bonus points for their team. On the 10th week of the league an elimination tournament is held, where the players who are lowest on the competition ladder play first and continue playing until eliminated. The final three teams remaining in the elimination play three games together to decide the winner of the league.

Players in the social leagues are graded according to skill and a percentage handicap calculated from the combined skills of the players, so that teams with less skill are still able to win some games. There are rules that players must abide by and there are referees standing in the arena watching the game, who are able to punish rule-breakers. Trophies are awarded to the winning team, highest individual average score, fairest and best and most improved.

The North vs. South competition was the competition played between the Northbridge and Willetton stores, so-called because both stores are on either side of the Swan River, which divides Perth. There is no handicap system, there are referees, and there are six players per team. Three rounds are held over a length of three weeks, played on Sundays, and the teams play at one venue for the first round, the other venue for the second round, and then both venues for the final round. A shield is awarded to the store with the winning team, and medals are awarded to the winning team, player with the highest average score, and for the best and fairest player, voted for by the referees.

ACT League
The ACT has been running a successful league for about 13 years. The format changes every season (which last about 6 months) to keep more people around. Canberra is running the Nexus Pro system. There is a shield for the winning team which is mounted on the wall at Zone 3 in Canberra, as well as trophies given out to individual players on the top 3 teams, as well as best and fairest, most improved, and high score. Canberra also has a horses-arse award, given to the player who is involved in the most idiotic part of the season.

South East Queensland Leagues 
Laserzone have sites in Lawnton and Sunshine Coast that run weekly leagues. Both sites run Infusion equipment and cater for all skill levels at the weekly league. Experienced players will take on new blood to help them get started, and a handicap system similar to the Western Australian system has been adopted to encourage new teams to enter. Each month a competition is run for intermediate and experienced player only. This is a chance for the experienced players to play as hard as they can, and for the intermediate players to get a tase of what competitive laser tag is all about. Competitions include a Brisbane v Sunshine Coast teams event (North v South), Doubles, Triples & Zone Ball tournaments.

The format of the regular social League is a team-based competition similar to the Western Australia system. The main differences is that individual high scorers do not earn a bonus point for their team in SEQ leagues and seasons vary from 8 – 12 weeks. SEQ sites also play with no denial scoring on which means players do not lose extra points for being deactivated whilst destroying a base station. At the end of the season medallions are awarded to the 3 finalists.

New Zealand Leagues 
The Megazone Laser Tag  centre in Mt Wellington is currently the only centre in New Zealand to run competitive leagues. Usually they are only friendly leagues with no prizes however once in a while they have a ten-week team-based league which is competitive with each team having the same people on it every week. Variations of league games such as doubles and triples (2/3 players on each team) are also sometimes played on these nights.

Australian Nationals
The Australian Zone Nationals has been held annually since 1999. The main event is the team competition, which currently attracts approximately 20 teams of between 5 and 6 players (plus alternates) from every Australian state and territory. Teams play about 24 games before semi-finals. All games have three teams playing. Typically all teams get a go in semifinals, but the system is stacked to favour teams who finished higher on the ladder at the end of the preliminary rounds. The scheme used is typically an Ascension or Skip Ascension. In 2007 the decision was made to switch final systems to System D. The top three teams go into a grand final, which is a three-game series in which each team plays on each colour once.

There are a number of minor tournaments held at the Nationals, including Solos, Doubles and Triples, which attract 90 to 100 players each. Solos typically has 20 players in each game, with no bases or reloads. Doubles typically has 10 teams of two in each game, with each player being able to shoot all three bases. Triples has approximately 7 teams of three in each game, with each player being able to shoot all bases, with the exact format being announced on the day of Triples starting. Other minor events include Masters (over 32s) and Women's.

Australian National Tournament Results

2007 Australian National Tournament
The 2007 National competition held in Bendigo was a significant event as it witnessed the entry of a team from the United States. "WMD" as they called themselves came to Australia, learnt to use Infusion (The system which Nationals is run on), and competed in the Teams, Triples, Doubles, Solos, Women's and Masters comps. A group of 3 Americans took out the triples competition, and the team ended up coming 5th in the competition.

New Zealand Competitions

2008 New Zealand Invitationals
The inaugural New Zealand Invitational was held from Monday 18th to Thursday 21 February 2008. The team competition was 9 teams of 6 players plus substitutes. Main part of the team competition was 48 games; each team played 16 games. The competition was spread over three different sites: Ponsonby (System Q), North Shore (Infusion), and Mt. Wellington (Infusion). Games at Ponsonby were played with only 5 players per side, and with stuns. HoCo was made up from players from both Hobart and Sunshine Coast.

2010 New Zealand Invitationals
The 2010 New Zealand Invitationals were held 6–10 September 2010 across the three Auckland Megazone sites (North Shore (Infusion), Ponsonby (Nexus FEC) and Mt Wellington (Infusion)). The rules were the same as the Darwin 2010 Nationals and the World Championships.

2012 New Zealand Invitationals
The 2012 New Zealand Invitationals were held from August 27–31, 2012 across the three Auckland Megazone sites (Mt Wellington (Infusion), Ponsonby (Nexus PRO) and North Shore (Infusion)). The rules were to be similar to the 2012 Australian Nationals competition.

2014 Australasian Titles
For the first time ever, the Australian National Titles were held in New Zealand in 2014 at Megazone Mt Wellington. It was also the first time a New Zealand team (Silverbacks) won the competition and the second time in a row that a NZ player had won the women's competition (Arcane). The competition was run using brand new Nexus Pro packs.

Zone World Championships

2009 Zone World Championships
The 2009 Zone World Championships was held in Tampere, Finland over May/June 2009. Teams from Australia, USA, Finland and Sweden competed in a range of game types, including an international team format game, a team eliminator game, doubles without bases, solos and LOR.

Key: USA = American Team or Player, FIN = Finnish Team or Player, SWE = Swedish Team or Player, AUS = Australian Team or Player

2011 Zone World Championships
This was held in Syracuse, NY, America from 5/11/2011 - 11/11/2011

See also 
 Lasertag
 Q-Zar - also developed in Australia

References 

 Darkzone WA website, on the topic of the game formats, Vampire, Time Warrior, Zone Ball, and League X (league game format).
 Darkzone WA information page, information about the general games (packs, phasors, etc.)
 Darkzone Boxhill, details about scoring in games

External links 
 Darkzone Laval Website Canada's longest running Laser Tag facility, located in Laval, Quebec
 Zone Empire Website - company who produces the technology that Darkzone / Zone 3 uses for its games
 Play Zone Laser Lists many of the world's Zone Laser Sites
 auszone.net Information regarding the Australian Zone National Championships, and Australian and New Zealand Leagues
 Zone Elite
 Lasertag Wiki

Indoor sports
Laser tag